In human neuroanatomy of the face, the stylohyoid branch of facial nerve frequently arises in conjunction with the digastric branch; it is long and slender, and enters the Stylohyoideus about its middle.

References

External links
 http://www.dartmouth.edu/~humananatomy/figures/chapter_47/47-5.HTM

Facial nerve